The Coronation of the Great Šišlam (or The Coronation of Shishlam Rabba) is a Mandaean religious text. The text is a detailed commentary on the initiation of the tarmida (junior priests), with detailed discussions on masbuta and masiqta rituals. The Scroll of Exalted Kingship is also used extensively alongside the Coronation in tarmida initiation rituals. Similar esoteric texts that are traditionally used exclusively by Mandaean priests include The Thousand and Twelve Questions, and The Baptism of Hibil Ziwa.

The Scroll of Exalted Kingship is essentially a much more detailed version of the Coronation. Whereas the Coronation simply lists the sequences of prayers and rituals to be performed, the Exalted Kingship also provides symbolic explanations for each prayer and ritual that is performed.

Manuscripts and translations
In 1962, E. S. Drower published an English translation and commentary of the text, which was based on Manuscript 54 of the Drower Collection (DC 54, which Drower dates to 1008 A.H., i.e. 1590-1591 A.D.) and Or. 6592, British Museum (dated by Drower to 1298 A.H., i.e. 1880-1881 A.D.). Drower donated DC 54 to the Bodleian Library in 1961.

Prayer sequence

See also

Scroll of Exalted Kingship
The Thousand and Twelve Questions
The Baptism of Hibil Ziwa

References

External links
Full text at Archive.org

Mandaean texts